Étang des Redouneilles des brebis is a lake in Ariège, France.

Redouneilles des brebis